The following table presents a listing of the Dominican Republic's provinces and the dates of their creation.

Extinct Province

There were two provinces that are extinct in the Dominican Republic.

External links
Dominican Provinces

Provinces by Provincehood
Dominican Republic, Provinces of the
Provinces